Manuel Alejandro Zárate del Río (born June 3, 1988) is a Mexican professional footballer, currently playing as a forward for Toluca, wearing jersey #22. He made his debut August 15, 2009 against Monterrey, a game which resulted 1-0 for Monterrey.

External links
 

1988 births
Living people
Liga MX players
Deportivo Toluca F.C. players
Footballers from Guadalajara, Jalisco
Atlético Mexiquense footballers
Mexican footballers
Association football forwards